Alabama's first aeronautical event was on 10 March 1910 with the flight of a Wright biplane flown by Orville Wright in Montgomery, Alabama.

Events 
 1909: E.T. Odum brings an aircraft to the Alabama State Fair.
 15 March 1910: Orville and Wilbur Wright establish the nation's first civilian flying school in Montgomery, Alabama.
 1931: Steadham Acker starts the National Air Carnival series of air shows at Birmingham Municipal Airport.
 10 July 1991: L'Express Airlines Flight 508 crashed at Birmingham Municipal Airport.

Aircraft Manufacturers 
 Boeing manufactures the Delta IV rocket in Decatur, Alabama.
 Continental Motors, Inc., Mobile, Alabama 1929- Major producer of aircraft engines for general aviation aircraft.
 Airbus builds aircraft in the A320 family at the Mobile Aeroplex at Brookley industrial complex.

Aerospace 
73,000 jobs are based in Alabama in support of aerospace.

National Space Science and Technology Center a joint research venture between NASA and the seven research universities of the state of Alabama.
Continental Motors Services provides final assembly of the CD-135 and CD-155 engine in Fairhope, Alabama.

Airports 
 List of Airports in Alabama

Colleges and Universities
Auburn University is home to the nation's oldest continually operated flight school and is the only 4-year aviation degree in the State of Alabama. Recently, Auburn University created the Auburn University Aviation Center. The Aviation Center's objective is to, "...create a robust, visionary aviation program that creates opportunities for students and fosters economic development in the state."

Commercial Service 
Birmingham-Shuttlesworth International Airport provides air service with 1.4 million operations annually.

Government and Military

 All flight operations in Alabama are conducted within FAA oversight.
 Maxwell Air Force Base is the headquarters of Air University (United States Air Force).
 The Redstone Arsenal supports missile and space operations.
 The Marshall Space Flight Center supports NASA operations.
 The U. S. Army Air Corps' Tuskegee Airmen were trained at Tuskegee, Alabama
 The Alabama State Trooper Aviation Unit was formed in 1975 using four Bell H-13 Sioux and one Cessna 182. The unit currently operates one Bell 206L, one Bell 407, seven OH-58 helicopters and three Cessna 182’s, a Piper Navajo and King Air 200.
 Cullman City Police Department operates two OH-58, Dale County Sheriff's Office operates 3 OH-58's, Etowah County Sheriff's Office operates one OH-58 and one Cessna 172, Jefferson County Sheriff's Office operates two OH-58's, Limestone County Alabama Sheriff's Office operates one OH-58, Morgan County Sheriff's Office operates one OH-58, Tuscaloosa County Sheriff's Aviation Unit operates two OH-58's, Tuscaloosa Alabama Police Department operates two OH-58's

Museums 
 The Southern Museum of Flight is located in Birmingham, Alabama and houses the Alabama Aviation Hall of Fame.
 The United States Army Aviation Museum is located on Fort Rucker near Ozark, Alabama.
 The U.S. Space & Rocket Center is located in Huntsville, Alabama

Gallery

References